Massimo Ellul is a Maltese businessman and active in the voluntary organisational field.

Ellul is the chief executive of a group of companies in the marketing and management consultancy field operating in Malta, Manchester, Edinburgh, Sicily and Dubai, He specialised his studies in marketing and management in Malta, the UK and the US and is an alumnus of the Judge Business School of the University of Cambridge. He was also an elected official of the Executive Committee of the European Forum for Urban Security under the aegis of the Council of Europe and represents Malta in the European Disability Forum and the European Union of Supported Employment. In Scotland, Dr. Ellul was very much involved with the Friends of Rosslyn [Chapel], and has lectured extensively in the region. He was admitted as Liveryman of the Worshipful Company of Marketors of the City of London and in 2005 was granted the Freedom of the City of London.

He is a published author in Malta, the US and the UK on subjects varying from medieval and modern history to social independent living.  Some of his books have been translated into other languages, including Russian and Hungarian.

He occupied various posts in the Malta Labour Party, including Secretary of the Youth Commission, International Secretary of the Labour Youth Forum, President of the Young Students' Movement, Assistant General Secretary and Assistant Education Secretary of the Malta Labour Party.
Throughout his political career, he chaired a number of important party committees and was responsible for extensive mass events in Malta. He was a Parliamentary Candidate for the Malta general elections of 1996 and 1998.,

In 2002, he was appointed as Chancellor of the Grand Priory of the Mediterranean of the Hospitaller Order of Saint Lazarus of Jerusalem and is the Chairman of the Saint Lazarus Foundation. In 2008, he was appointed as the Grand Chancellor of the Hospitaller Order of Saint Lazarus of Jerusalem. Ellul was elected as the Honorary Secretary of the Malta Federation of Organizations and Persons with Disability (MFOPD) and Vice President of the Malta Association of Supported Employment.
 
Massimo Ellul was also the Chairman of the annual Malta International Folk Festival, and sits on/consults the board of directors of various firms and organisations in Malta, England, Scotland, Sicily and Dubai. In Malta, his management firm was instrumental in projecting a number of innovative firsts, including the management and promotion of international arena bands on the island, exporting and managing Maltese talent, the promotion of live music and the innovative use of marketing tools such as billboarding. His firm has been solicited on various occasions to give marketing and management consultancy services to a number of government ministries and entities in regions as diverse as Malta, Dubai, Al Ain, Hungary, Slovenia, the Sultanate of Oman, the United Kingdom and others. He is a Fellow of the Royal Society of Arts and a Companion of the Institute of Sales & Marketing Management, amongst other international institutions.

References

1970 births
Living people
Maltese chief executives
Maltese marketing people
Maltese Roman Catholics
People from the City of London
Maltese male writers
People from Cospicua
Labour Party (Malta) politicians
People associated with the University of Cambridge